Putnisite is a mineral composed of strontium, calcium, chromium, sulfur, carbon, oxygen and hydrogen.  It was discovered on the Polar Bear Peninsula in Shire of Dundas, Western Australia in 2007 during mining activity. Following identification and recognition by the IMA in 2012 the mineral was named after mineralogists Andrew and Christine Putnis.  

Putnisite has unique chemical and structural properties, and does not appear to be related to any of the existing mineralogical families.   Crystals are translucent purple, but show distinct pleochroism (from pale purple to pale bluish grey, depending on the angle of observation) and leave pink streaks when rubbed on a flat surface. 

Putnisite occurs as small (< 0.5 mm) cube-like crystals in volcanic rock.  The mineral formed during the oxidation environment within komatiite to dioritic bodies containing sulfide minerals.

References 

Strontium minerals
Calcium minerals
Chromium minerals
Sulfate minerals
Carbonate minerals
Hydroxide minerals
Orthorhombic minerals
Minerals in space group 62